The Porto Football Association (Portuguese: Associação de Futebol do Porto; abbreviated as AF Porto) is the district governing body for the all football and futsal competitions in the Portuguese district of Porto. It is also the regulator of the clubs registered in the district.

It was officially founded on 10 August 1912 by the initiative of F.C. Porto and Leixões S.C., who were immediately joined by many other clubs, including some from outside districts. Today it's the largest football district association in the country with 340 clubs and 19.796 athletes in all age categories, 750 referees and organises around 12.800 per season.

Below the Campeonato de Portugal (Portuguese third level) the competitions are organised at a district level (known in Portuguese as Distritais) with each District Association organising its competitions according to geographical and other factors. AF Porto runs a league competition with four divisions, at the fourth, fifth, sixth and seventh levels of the Portuguese football league system and a cup competition known as Taça AF Porto (since 2013–14). Taça AF Porto winners and Elite Division runner-ups earn a spot in the following season's Taça de Portugal.

Porto FA clubs in national leagues (2020–21)
Currently there are 17 Porto FA clubs playing in the national leagues (first, second and third levels of the Portuguese football league system. Aves, Boavista, Leça, Leixões, Paços de Ferreira, Penafiel, Porto, Rio Ave, Salgueiros, Tirsense, Trofense, Varzim, the forerunners to Felgueiras and the defunct Académico do Porto have competed in Primeira Liga, which at 14 clubs is the highest total for a District Association.

Primeira Liga
 Boavista F.C.
 F.C. Porto
 Rio Ave F.C.
 F.C. Paços de Ferreira

LigaPro
 C.D. Aves
 F.C. Penafiel
 F.C. Porto B
 Leixões S.C.
 Varzim S.C.

Campeonato de Portugal
 A.R. São Martinho
 Amarante F.C.
 C.D. Trofense
 F.C. Felgueiras 1932
 F.C. Pedras Rubras
 Gondomar S.C.
 Leça F.C.
 S.C. Coimbrões
 U.S.C. Paredes
 C.F. Canelas 2010
 Valadares Gaia F.C.
 F.C. Tirsense
 S.C. Salgueiros

Current Championships (2020–21)
The AF Porto runs the following divisions:
 Elite Division (tier 4)
 Honour Division (tier 5)
 First Division (tier 6)
 Second Division (tier 7)

List of champions

All-time Primeira Liga table
These are the most successful Porto FA clubs in the history of Primeira Liga (as of 02/2021):

Notes

References

See also
 Portuguese District Football Associations
 Portuguese football competitions
 List of football clubs in Portugal

Porto
Sports organizations established in 1912
1912 establishments in Portugal